Tabidia is a genus of moths of the family Crambidae described by Pieter Cornelius Tobias Snellen 1880.

Species
Tabidia aculealis (Walker, 1866)
Tabidia candidalis (Warren, 1896)
Tabidia craterodes Meyrick, 1894
Tabidia flexulalis Snellen, 1899
Tabidia fuscifusalis Hampson, 1917
Tabidia inconsequens (Warren, 1896)
Tabidia insanalis Snellen, 1879 (Borneo, Celebes, Papua New Guinea)
Tabidia obvia Du & Li, 2014
Tabidia nacoleialis Hampson, 1912
Tabidia strigiferalis Hampson, 1900
Tabidia truncatalis Hampson, 1899 (New Guinea)

References

Pyraustinae
Crambidae genera
Taxa named by Pieter Cornelius Tobias Snellen